Steven Boyer (also known as Steve Boyer, born February 15, 1979) is an American stage and television actor, comedian, and musician, from Westerville, Ohio. He is best known for originating the role of Jason/Tyrone in Hand to God Off-Broadway and in the Broadway production. This role earned him a Tony nomination for Best Leading Actor in a Play. He played the role of Dwayne Reed in the NBC sitcom Trial & Error, with John Lithgow, as well as ADC Jerry Gorsch on Chicago Fire. He played a minor role in Martin Scorsese's The Wolf of Wall Street alongside Leonardo DiCaprio. He has also played several small parts in television, including The Good Wife, Law & Order, and Orange Is the New Black.

Life and career
Boyer went to Westerville North High School. He also spent time at Columbus Junior Theatre, in his youth. He graduated from The Juilliard School, Drama Division in 2001 where he received the Michel Saint‐Denis Award for outstanding graduate.

In 2014, the Actors’ Equity Association awarded him the Clarence Derwent Award.

In 2005, when acting roles dried up, Boyer toured colleges, universities, and venues as a stand-up comic.

Boyer also plays lead guitar in a rock band, The U.S. Open, with fellow NBC actor William Jackson Harper on drums.

Filmography

Film

Television

Stage

References

External links 
 
 Steven Boyer at Internet Off-Broadway Database
 
 Steven Boyer at BroadwayWorld

Living people
American male stage actors
21st-century American male actors
Year of birth missing (living people)
Place of birth missing (living people)